The Politics of Umbria, one of the 20 regions of Italy, takes place in a framework of a semi-presidential representative democracy, whereby the president of the region is the head of government, and of a pluriform multi-party system. Legislative power is vested in the Legislative Assembly of Umbria, while executive power is exercised by the Regional Cabinet led by the President, who is directly elected by the people. The current statute, which regulates the functioning of regional institutions, has been in force since 2005.

After World War II Umbria became a stronghold of the Italian Communist Party. The Communists and their successors (the Democratic Party of the Left, the Democrats of the Left and finally the Democratic Party) have governed the region since 1970. For these reasons, Umbria was long considered part of the so-called "Red belt". The centre-left's dominance ended with the 2019 regional election, in which Donatella Tesei of Lega Nord–Umbria was elected President of Umbria by a landslide.

Legislative branch

The Legislative Assembly of Umbria (Assemblea Legislativa dell'Umbria) is composed of 30 members. 24 councillors are elected in provincial constituencies by proportional representation using the largest remainder method with a Droop quota and open lists, while 6 councillors (elected in bloc) come from a "regional list", including the President-elect. One seat is reserved for the candidate who comes second. If a coalition wins more than 50% of the total seats in the council with PR, only 3 candidates from the regional list will be chosen and the number of those elected in provincial constituencies will be 26. If the winning coalition receives less than 40% of votes special seats are added to the council to ensure a large majority for the President's coalition.

The council is elected for a five-year term, but, if the President suffers a vote of no confidence, resigns or dies, under the simul stabunt, simul cadent clause introduced in 1999 (literally they will stand together or they will fall together), also the council is dissolved and a snap election is called.

Executive branch
The regional government (giunta regionale) is presided by the President of the Region (Presidente della Regione), who is elected for a five-year term, and is composed of the president and the ministers or assessors (assessori), who are currently five, including a vice president.

List of presidents

Local government

Provinces
Umbria is divided in two provinces, which have been a traditional heartland of the left, from the Italian Communist Party to the current Democratic Party.

Municipalities
Umbria is also divided in 92 comuni (municipalities), most of which were established in the Middle Ages. A large majority of them are controlled by the Democratic Party.

Provincial capitals

Other municipalities with more than 20,000 inhabitants

Parties and elections

Latest regional election

In the latest regional election, which took place on 27 October 2019, Donatella Tesei of Lega Nord (Lega Nord Umbria) was elected president by a landslide, ending 49 years of uninterrupted "reign" by the Italian Communist Party and its successors. The League was largely the largest party.

References

External links
Umbria Region
Legislative Assembly of Umbria
Statute of Umbria

 
Umbria